Putzeysius is a genus of beetles in the family Carabidae, containing the following species:

 Putzeysius coecus Sciaky & Grottolo, 1996
 Putzeysius quadriceps (Putzeys, 1870)

References

Trechinae